"Funkytown" is a 1980 disco song performed by Lipps Inc. and covered many times.

Funkytown or Funky Town may also refer to:

 Funkytown (film), a Canadian drama film released in 2010 (festival circuit) and 2011 (wide release)
 Funky Town (Camp Mulla album), 2012
 Funky Town (T-Bone Walker album), 1968
 Funky Town, a 2012 repackage of the 2011 EP Black Eyes by T-ara
 "Funky Town" (Namie Amuro song), 2007 song by Japanese R&B singer Namie Amuro
 Funkytown Music, an American record-label
 Funkytown HD2, an internet-radio-station belonging to WEEI-FM in Boston, Massachusetts
 A nickname for Fort Worth, TX
 A slang term for Memphis